The 1979 East Coast Conference men's basketball tournament was held February 26 – March 3, 1979.  The champion gained and an automatic berth to the NCAA tournament.

Bracket and results

* denotes overtime game

References

East Coast Conference (Division I) men's basketball tournament
Tournament
1979 in sports in Pennsylvania
Basketball competitions in Philadelphia
College basketball tournaments in Pennsylvania
February 1979 sports events in the United States
March 1979 sports events in the United States